Edappal Ponnamkuzhi Veettil Parameswaran Sukumaran Nair (10 June 1948 – 16 June 1997), known mononymously as Sukumaran, was an Indian actor and producer of Malayalam films. Sukumaran became a popular film star in Malayalam cinema during the 1970s. He was considered one of the superstar trios of Malayalam cinema during the late 1970s and early 1980s along with Soman and Jayan.

Later, he became known for his character roles and antagonistic roles during the 1980s and 1990s, notably the villain in CID Unnikrishnan B.A., B.Ed.(1994) and Onnaam Muhurtham(1991), playing character roles in films like Souhrudam(1990). In 1978, he won the Kerala State Film Award for Best Actor for his performance in M. T. Vasudevan Nair's Bandhanam. As a producer, he produced such films as Irakal and Padayani.

On 16 June 1997, Sukumaran suffered a massive heart attack and died. He was 49 at the time of his death.

Early life
Sukumaran was born at Edappal, Ponnani taluk, Malabar District, Madras Presidency, British India (Present-day Malappuram District, Kerala, India) in the year 1948 as the eldest son of Parameshwaran Nair and Subhadra P Nair. He had two younger brothers and a sister. Dr Sethumadhavan, Dr Sivadasan and Smt Sathee Devi.

Sukumaran was educated at St. Thomas Higher Secondary School, Pala, and at Church Mission Society Higher Secondary School, Thrissur. After completing his master's degree in English literature from University College, Trivandrum with gold medal, he began a job as a college lecturer for three years at Government College, Kasaragod and Scott Christian College, Nagercoil.

Career

During his tenure teaching English at Scott Christian College in Nagercoil, Tamil Nadu, Sukumaran got an offer to act in the Malayalam movie Nirmalyam, directed by M. T. Vasudevan Nair. He accepted the role of a defiant youngster in the film. The film went on to win accolades from all over and won a couple of National Film Awards as well. Despite being noted as a talented actor, Sukumaran did not receive any offers for some time after. He was thinking of returning to the teaching profession, when he was offered a role in Shankupushpam. With that film, Sukumaran carved a niche for himself in the Malayalam film industry. He worked with director P. Venu in the film Thacholi Thankappan (1983).
Thakilu Kottampuram, directed by Balukiriyath was one of his Best films in the 80s, He then went on to act in substantial roles in films such as Avalude Ravukal, Angadi, Bandhanam, Etho Oru Swapnam, Manasa Vacha Karmana, Ahimsha, Spodanam, Shalini Ente Koottukari, Angakkuri, Kolilakkam, Theekkadal, Sandarbam, Witness and Kottayam Kunjachanan. By the year 1985, he had stopped playing hero roles. His role as a defiant police officer in Oru CBI Diary Kurippu and its sequel Jagratha, directed by K. Madhu, was noted for its characterisation and earned cult status when the third sequel in the series, Sethurama Iyer CBI, had Sai Kumar portraying the son of the police officer, with the mannerisms and voice tone of Sukumaran. Sukumaran won the Kerala State Film Award for Best Actor in 1978 for his role in Bandhanam.  Sukumaran had his own production company, called Indraraj Creations. One of his productions Irakal, directed by K. G. George, was selected for the Indian Panorama in the International Film Festival of India (IFFI). The Association of Malayalam Movie Artists (AMMA) had sidelined and unofficially banned Sukumaran from films for around three years during the mid-90s, for some of the comments he made on the industry and its politics. His last film was Shibiram, directed by T. S. Suresh Babu.

Personal life
Sukumaran married actress Mallika Sukumaran on 17 October 1978. They have two sons, both work in Malayalam film industry; Indrajith Sukumaran and Prithviraj Sukumaran. Actress Poornima Mohan and journalist Supriya Menon are his daughters-in-law. His grand daughter Prarthana Indrajith is a playback singer. Sukumaran died due to a massive heart attack on 16 June 1997.

Awards

Kerala State Film Award for Best Actor – 1978 – Bandhanam (directed by M. T. Vasudevan Nair)

Filmography

1970s

1980s

1990s

Posthumous Releases

Producer
Padayani
Irakal

References

External links
 
 Sukumaran at MSI

1948 births
1997 deaths
Male actors in Malayalam television
Indian male television actors
Male actors from Kerala
Kerala State Film Award winners
People from Malappuram district
Male actors in Malayalam cinema
Indian male film actors
Malayalam film producers
20th-century Indian male actors
Film producers from Thiruvananthapuram